Brian Lee may refer to:

Brian Lee (entrepreneur) (born 1971), American businessman
Brian Lee (ice hockey, born 1984), American professional ice hockey player
Brian Lee (ice hockey, born 1987), American professional ice hockey player
Brian Lee (rugby league), New Zealand rugby league player
Brian Lee (soccer) (born 1971), British-born head coach of the LSU women's soccer team
Brian Lee (songwriter) (born c. 1981), American songwriter
Brian Lee (public speaker) (born 1950), Canadian author, executive and speaker
Brian Lee (wrestler) (born 1966), American professional wrestler
Brian Lee (American football) (born 1975), American football player
Brian North Lee (1936–2007), teacher and expert on bookplates
Brian Lee (football manager) (1936-2023), former manager of Wycombe Wanderers and Director of Bisham Abbey

See also
Bryan Lee (1943–2020), American blues guitarist and singer